Sir Lionel is the younger son of King Bors of Gaunnes (or Gaul) and Evaine and brother of Bors the Younger in Arthurian legend since the Lancelot-Grail cycle. He is a double cousin of Lancelot and cousin of Lancelot's younger half-brother Hector de Maris (not to be confused with the older Sir Ector, who was King Arthur's foster-father). He later became the subject of one of the famous Child Ballads (#18).

Arthurian legend

When their father dies in battle against King Claudas, Lionel and Bors are rescued by the Lady of the Lake and raised in her otherworldly kingdom alongside her foster-son Lancelot. Like Bors and Lancelot, Lionel becomes a Knight of the Round Table upon reaching the age and then proving himself in heroic deeds.

One day, while travelling with Lancelot as a young man, Lionel is captured by the rogue knight Turquine, who whips him with briars and throws him in the dungeon. The scenario repeats itself later while he is on the Quest for the Holy Grail, where he proves very unworthy of the blessed object by trying to kill his brother for not rescuing him. Bors had seen Lionel getting beaten and led away, but had to make a decision to save either him or a young girl being dragged in the opposite direction. He saves the girl, and fears Lionel dead. But Lionel escapes, and attacks Bors the next time they meet. Bors proves himself worthy of the Grail when he refuses to fight back, and Lionel kills a hermit and Sir Calogrenant, a fellow Knight of the Round Table, when they try to protect Bors from his wrath. Before Lionel can strike his brother, however, God intervenes and immobilises him.

Lionel and the rest of his family follow Lancelot into exile when the affair with Queen Guinevere is exposed. Lionel participates in the battles against King Arthur and becomes King of Gaunnes. After the Battle of Camlann (Salisbury), Lancelot's family returns to Britain to defeat the remainder of Mordred's forces. Lionel is slain by Mordred's young son Melehan; Bors avenges his death.

Edward III of England
The 14th-century King of England, Edward III, strongly identified with Sir Lionel since his youth. King Edward role-played as Lionel at the Round Table tournaments that he organized, and even named his second son, Lionel of Antwerp, Duke of Clarence, after the Arthurian romance character.

Folk ballad 
Sir Lionel is the subject of the late-medieval folk ballad "Sir Lionel", recorded as Child Ballad 18 and Roud No. 29, in which he slays a giant wild boar. This song has much in common with a medieval tale about a knight who slays a terrifyingly fiendish boar in Sidon, in the fourteenth century romance of Sir Eglamour of Artois. The terrible swine is a frequent foe in romantic tales, for instance the beast Twrch Trwyth in Culhwch and Olwen.

The song has been recorded several times in the twentieth century, exclusively in the United States. The influential Appalachian folk singer Jean Ritchie recorded a version passed down through her family entitled "Old Bangum" on the album Ballads from her Appalachian Family Tradition (1961), with an Appalachian dulcimer accompaniment. John and Alan Lomax recorded two versions in the 1930s in Harlan, Kentucky and Austin, Texas. Several Ozark versions were also collected, and can be heard online courtesy of the University of Arkansas and Missouri State University.

Modern works
In the musical Camelot, Lionel is the knight brought back to life by Lancelot after he accidentally kills him in a joust (though the film switches him with Dinadan). The two do not seem to be related.
Lionel appears in the 1998 animated film Quest for Camelot as the father of the protagonist, Kayley, who wished to follow her father's footsteps. During the beginning of the film, Lionel is killed by the main antagonist, Lord Ruber, who intends to claim the throne of Camelot for himself, while trying to kill King Arthur, whom Lionel defended before he died.

See also
List of the Child Ballads

References

External links

One version of the folk ballad Sir Lionel

Arthurian characters
Child Ballads
Knights of the Round Table